John Paul Corigliano Jr. (born February 16, 1938) is an American composer of contemporary classical music. His scores, now numbering over one hundred, have won him the Pulitzer Prize, five Grammy Awards, Grawemeyer Award for Music Composition, and an Oscar. 

He is a distinguished professor of music at Lehman College and the Graduate Center of the City University of New York and on the composition faculty at the Juilliard School. Corigliano is best known for his Symphony No. 1, a response to the AIDS epidemic, and his film score for François Girard's The Red Violin (1997), which he subsequently adapted as the 2003 Concerto for Violin and Orchestra ("The Red Violin") for Joshua Bell.

Biography

Before 1964
Corigliano was born in New York City to a musical family. His Italian-American father, John Paul Corigliano Sr., was concertmaster of the New York Philharmonic for 23 years. Corigliano's mother, Rose Buzen, was Jewish, and an accomplished educator and pianist. 

He attended P.S. 241 and Midwood High School in Brooklyn. He studied composition at Columbia University (BA 1959)  and at the Manhattan School of Music. He studied with Otto Luening, Vittorio Giannini, and Paul Creston. Before achieving success as a composer, Corigliano worked as assistant to the producer on the Leonard Bernstein Young People's Concerts and as a session producer for classical artists such as André Watts. He was also music director for New York's listener-sponsored radio station WBAI.

1964–1987
Corigliano first came to prominence in 1964 at the age of 26 when his Sonata for Violin and Piano (1963) was the only winner of the chamber-music competition of the Spoleto Festival in Italy.  In 1970, Corigliano teamed up with David Hess to create The Naked Carmen. In a recent communication with David Hess, Hess acknowledged that The Naked Carmen was originally conceived by Corigliano and himself as a way to update the most popular opera of our time (Carmen). Mercury Records wanted the classical and popular divisions to work together and after a meeting with Joe Bott, Scott Mampe and Bob Reno, it was decided to proceed with the project. In Hess's own words, the project was "a collective decision".

After he was awarded a Guggenheim Fellowship, Corigliano began teaching at the Manhattan School of Music and became a music faculty member at Lehman College. He credits his first two concerti for solo wind for both changing his art and his career. It was during the composition of his Oboe Concerto (1975) and especially his Clarinet Concerto (1977) that he first used an "architectural" method of composing.

In 1974, he wrote his first film score for the documentary A Williamsburg Sampler. He later wrote the score for Altered States (1980) and his third film score for Revolution (1985). The award-winning score for Revolution is one of Corigliano's most impressive creations, although it is less known, as it was never released in any recorded format; it has existed in a bootleg form until Varèse Sarabande officially released the score for a limited time in December 2009 through their CD club, and then as a regular release in 2010. Corigliano later used portions of the score in his first symphony.

For flutist James Galway, he composed his third wind concerto, titled Pied Piper Fantasy, which premiered with the Los Angeles Philharmonic (1982). In 1984, he became Distinguished Professor of Music at Lehman College and left his position at Manhattan School of Music in 1986.

1987–present
In 1987, Corigliano was the first composer ever to serve as Composer-in-Residence for the Chicago Symphony Orchestra. During his residency, he composed his first symphony, which was inspired by the AIDS epidemic and to honor the friends he lost. His first symphony won him the University of Louisville Grawemeyer Award for Music Composition in 1991 and his first Grammy Award for Best Classical Contemporary Composition in 1992.

Corigliano's first opera, The Ghosts of Versailles, was the Metropolitan Opera's first commission in nearly three decades, celebrating the company's 100th anniversary. The opera was a huge success at the premiere and received the International Classic Music Awards Composition of the Year award in 1992. In 1991, Corigliano became faculty member at the Juilliard School. In 1995, he was commissioned to write String Quartet (1995) by Lincoln Center for the Cleveland Quartet, which won him his second Grammy Award for Best Contemporary Classical Composition. Corigliano's fourth film score was for François Girard's The Red Violin (1997) which won him his second Academy Award nomination and the 1999 Oscar for best film score. Portions of the score were used in his violin concerto (2003), written for Joshua Bell, who premiered it on September 19, 2003, with the Baltimore Symphony Orchestra. In 2001, he received the Pulitzer Prize for his Symphony No. 2 (2001).

In 2011, Corigliano's song cycle One Sweet Morning premiered at Avery Fisher Hall by mezzo-soprano Stephanie Blythe and the New York Philharmonic, to commemorate the 10th anniversary of the September 11 attacks. Other important commissions have been Chiaroscuro (1997) for two pianos tuned a quarter tone apart for The Dranoff International Two Piano Foundation, Vocalise (1999) for the New York Philharmonic, Mr. Tambourine Man: Seven Poems of Bob Dylan (2003) which earned him his third Grammy Award, Symphony No. 3 Circus Maximus (2004) for the University of Texas Wind Ensemble, STOMP (2011) written for the 2011 Tchaikovsky Competition in Russia, and Conjurer (2008) commissioned by an international consortium of six orchestras for Evelyn Glennie and winning him his fifth Grammy Award.

Among Corigliano's students are David Sampson, Eric Whitacre, Elliot Goldenthal, Edward Knight, Nico Muhly, Roger Bergs, Michael Gilbertson, Gary Kulesha, Scott Glasgow, John Mackey, Michael Bacon, Avner Dorman, Mason Bates, Steven Bryant, Jefferson Friedman, Jamie Howarth, Dinuk Wijeratne and David Ludwig. In 1996, The Corigliano Quartet was founded, taking his name in tribute.

Music

Most of Corigliano's work has been for symphony orchestra. He employs a wide variety of styles, sometimes even within the same work, but aims to make his work accessible to a relatively large audience. Many of his works have been performed and recorded by some of the most prominent orchestras, soloists, and chamber musicians in the world. He has written symphonies, as well as works for string orchestra, wind band, concerti, chamber and solo pieces, opera, as well as for film.

Corigliano's most distinguished works include his Clarinet Concerto (1977), Symphony No. 1 (1988), The Ghosts of Versailles (1991), Symphony No. 2 for string orchestra (2000), Mr. Tambourine Man: Seven Poems of Bob Dylan (2000), and his score for the film The Red Violin (1998). His clarinet concerto is the first by an American composer to have entered the standard repertoire since Aaron Copland's clarinet concerto.

Awards
 1991 – University of Louisville Grawemeyer Award for Symphony No. 1
 1991 – Grammy Award for Best Classical Contemporary Composition for Symphony No. 1
 1992 – GLAAD Media Award for Outstanding Composition for Symphony No 1
 1997 – Grammy Award for Best Classical Contemporary Composition for String Quartet
 1999 – Academy Award for Original Music Score for The Red Violin
 2001 – Pulitzer Prize for Music for Symphony No. 2
 2009 – Grammy Award for Best Classical Contemporary Composition for Mr. Tambourine Man: Seven Poems of Bob Dylan
 2009 – Grammy Award for Best Classical Vocal Performance for Mr. Tambourine Man: Seven Poems of Bob Dylan
 2014 – Grammy Award for Best Classical Instrumental Solo for Conjurer: Concerto For Percussionist & String Orchestra

Personal life
Corigliano has lived in New York City all his life. He currently divides his time between homes in Manhattan and Kent Cliffs (in the Hudson Valley of Upstate New York) with his husband, the composer-librettist Mark Adamo; the two were married in California by the conductor Marin Alsop in August 2008, just prior to the enactment of Proposition 8.

References

External links
 
 
 
John Corigliano biography at G. Schirmer
 Sony BMG Masterworks' John Corigliano Podcast
 Classical Archives Interview
 , WNCN-FM, February 16, 1981

Living people
1938 births
20th-century American composers
20th-century American male musicians
21st-century American male musicians
21st-century American Jews
21st-century American composers
20th-century classical composers
21st-century classical composers
American male classical composers
American classical composers
Columbia University alumni
Manhattan School of Music alumni
Lehman College faculty
Members of the American Academy of Arts and Letters
Best Original Music Score Academy Award winners
Best Original Score Genie and Canadian Screen Award winners
Grammy Award winners
Jewish American classical composers
Jewish American artists
Pulitzer Prize for Music winners
American LGBT musicians
LGBT classical composers
LGBT classical musicians
LGBT people from New York (state)
American people of Italian descent
People of Calabrian descent
Pupils of Otto Luening
Midwood High School alumni
Cedille Records artists
People from Manhattan
People from Kent, New York
Composers from New York City